Tamango is a 1958 French/Italian film directed by John Berry, a blacklisted American director who exiled himself to Europe. The film stars Dorothy Dandridge, Curd Jürgens, Alex Cressan and Jean Servais.

Based on a short story written by Prosper Mérimée that was first published in 1829, the film concerns a slave ship on its crossing from Africa to Cuba, the various people that it carries and the slaves' rebellion while on board.

Plot
Captain Reiker, a Dutch sea captain, embarks on what he intends to be his last slave-ship voyage. After capturing slaves with the complicity of an African chief, Reiker starts his voyage for Cuba. Along with the slaves below deck, the passengers include his mistress, the slave Aiché, and the ship's doctor, Corot. Tamango, one of the captured men, plans a revolt and tries to persuade Aiché to join him and the other slaves. When the captured slaves rebel, Tamango holds Aiché hostage. A deadlock between the two sides develops and Captain Reiker states that he will fire a cannon into the ship's hold and kill all the slaves unless they surrender. Aiché is given a chance to leave by Tamango, but after looking up the ladder that leads out of the hold, she chooses to stay with her fellow slaves. The captain fulfills his threat and shoots the cannon into the hold.

Controversy
The film was controversial in different parts of the world. Although the project was filmed in the French city of Nice, France banned Tamango in its West African colonies "for fear it would cause dissent among the natives." The film was released in 1959 in New York City but did not receive nationwide distribution until 1962, as it ran afoul of the Hays Code restriction on scenes depicting miscegenation.

Cast
 Dorothy Dandridge as Aiché, Reiker's mistress 
 Curd Jürgens as Captain John Reiker 
 Jean Servais as Doctor Corot 
 Alex Cressan as Tamango 
 Roger Hanin as 1st Mate Bebe 
 Guy Mairesse as Werner 
 Clément Harari as Cook
 Doudou Babet as Chadi 
 Habib Benglia as Le chef noir
 Pierre Rosso as the diving sailor

References

External links
 
 
 

1958 drama films
1958 films
Films about race and ethnicity
Films about slavery
Films based on works by Prosper Mérimée
Films directed by John Berry
Films set in the 1810s
French drama films
Films about interracial romance
Italian drama films
Films set on ships
English-language French films
English-language Italian films
Films scored by Joseph Kosma
Films about rebels
1950s Italian films
1950s French films